Horst von Saurma-Jeltsch (born Horst Vieselmann, 28 August 1954) is the former chief editor of the German automobile magazine Sport auto until February 2013.  He also had a brief racing career but is best known for skillful driving at the Nürburgring.

He participated in the 1985 TT-F1 race on the Isle of Man and finished in 25th position.

Supertests
A well-known feature of Sport Auto is the "Supertest", wherein Saurma tests sports cars at their limit on the track (using fully road-legal trim) and their resulting lap times at the Nürburgring and the Hockenheimring are compared. In 2004, Saurma set the Nürburgring lap record for a production car by taking the Porsche Carrera GT around in 7 minutes 32 seconds. Saurma's laps for Sport Auto are often taken as benchmark times for their respective vehicles. Saurma continues the "Supertests" as a freelance author, after having resigned as chief editor.

See also
Nordschleife fastest lap times

References

External links
sport auto (German language)

1954 births
Living people
Sportspeople from Stuttgart
German racing drivers
German journalists
German male journalists
Racing drivers from Baden-Württemberg
ADAC GT Masters drivers
German male writers
Audi Sport TT Cup drivers
Nürburgring 24 Hours drivers